Ghorewaha is a village in Tanda tehsil, Hoshiarpur district of Punjab State, India.

Ghorewaha Pin code is 146116.

Babak (1 km), Littar (1 km), Nangal Jamal (1 km), Nangal Farid (1 km), Jaura (2 km), Chahal (3 km) are the nearby villages to Ghorewaha. Ghorewaha is surrounded by Urmar Tanda Tehsil towards North, Bhogpur Tehsil towards South, Bhunga Tehsil towards North, Hoshiarpur-I Tehsil towards East.

Ghorewaha is on the border of Hoshiarpur district, Jalandhar district and Kapurthala district.

The famous novel by Jagdish Chandra, which is a prescribed book in the curriculum of Hindi Literature courses of many universities, has the village of Ghorewaha as the location where the story of the novel is based. The novel is about the 'chamars'- the cobblers who live in 'Chamadari' locality of Ghorewaha and their plight in a society dominated by the upper caste.

Education 
Ghorewaha has two schools, one government school & a private school (Christian Green Wood Senior Secondary School). The village has a literacy rate of 78%.

See also
 List of villages in India

References
 2011 Census of India Data
Villages in Hoshiarpur district